Manú Airport  is an airstrip serving the village of Boca Manú and the Manú National Park in the Madre de Dios Region of Peru.

See also

Transport in Peru
List of airports in Peru

References

External links
Google Maps - Manú
OpenStreetMap - Manú
OurAirports - Manú
SkyVector - Manú

Airports in Peru
Buildings and structures in Madre de Dios Region